Octospinifer is a genus of worms belonging to the family Neoechinorhynchidae.

The species of this genus are found in Northern America.

Species:

Octospinifer macilentus 
Octospinifer rohitaii 
Octospinifer torosus 
Octospinifer variabilis

References

Neoechinorhynchidae
Acanthocephala genera